Sir John Lackey  (6 October 1830 – 11 November 1903) was a magistrate and politician in colonial New South Wales, President of the New South Wales Legislative Council 1892 to 1903.

Early life
Lackey was born in Sydney, New South Wales, son of William Lackey and his second wife Mary,  O'Dowd.

His grandfather was a wealthy publican and paid for his education Lackey was educated at the Sydney College, subsequently adopting pastoral pursuits in the Parramatta district. In 1852 he became a magistrate.

Parliamentary career
He unsuccessfully contested Central Cumberland at the 1859 election, He was the first of two members elected for Parramatta at the election on 8 December 1860. James Byrnes took offence at being placed second behind a newcomer, stating that the majority of voters had decided that he was not fit to serve them and resigned in March 1861 without taking his seat. Lackey strongly supported the passing of the Robertson Land Acts in 1861. He was defeated at Parramatta at the election on 24 November 1864, but on 27 June 1867 he won the Central Cumberland by-election to re-enter the Assembly. He was Chairman of Committees from February 1870 August 1872. From February 1875 to March 1877, he was Secretary for Public Works in the third Robertson ministry. In 1877 he was Minister of Justice and Public Instruction in the short-lived fourth Robertson ministry and was again Secretary for Public Works in the Parkes-Robertson Administration from December 1878 to January 1883.

In August 1885 he resigned from the Legislative Assembly and was appointed to the Legislative Council in December 1885. In 1889 he was the Vice-President of the Executive Council in  the second Dibbs ministry. In August 1892 he was appointed President of the Legislative Council, serving until  his resignation as president on 23 May 1903.

Death
Lackey died on 	in Bong Bong, New South Wales, survived by two sons.

Honours

He was made a Knight Commander of the Order of St Michael and St George (KCMG) in 1894.

References

 

1830 births
1903 deaths
Australian Knights Commander of the Order of St Michael and St George
Members of the New South Wales Legislative Assembly
Members of the New South Wales Legislative Council
Presidents of the New South Wales Legislative Council
Politicians from Sydney
19th-century Australian politicians